General Brown may refer to:

United Kingdom
Chris Brown (British Army officer) (fl. 1970s–2010s), British Army lieutenant general
George Brown (British Army officer) (1790–1865), British Army general
Howard Clifton Brown (1868–1946), British Army brigadier general
John Brown (British Army officer) (died 1762), British Army major general
Peter Brown (soldier) (c. 1775–1853), British Army major general
William Gustavus Brown (1809–1883), British Army general

United States

U.S. Army
Albert E. Brown (1889–1984), U.S. Army major general
Arthur E. Brown Jr. (born 1929), U.S. Army four-star general
Bryan D. Brown (born 1948), U.S. Army four-star general
Charles E. Brown Jr. (1911–1996), U.S. Army major general and Chief of Chaplains
Charles Elwood Brown (1834–1904), Union Army brevet brigadier general
Egbert B. Brown (1816–1902), Union Army brigadier general 
Harvey Brown (officer) (1795–1874), U.S. Army brevet major general
Jacob Brown (general) (1775–1828), U.S. Army major general
John M. Brown III (fl. 1960s–2000s), U.S. Army lieutenant general
John S. Brown (general) (fl. 1970s–2000s), U.S. Army brigadier general
Joseph W. Brown (1793–1880), U.S. Army general
Lloyd D. Brown (1892–1950), U.S. Army major general
Lytle Brown (1872–1951), U.S. Army major general
Preston Brown (general) (1872–1948), U.S. Army major general
Robert Brooks Brown (born 1959), U.S. Army general

U.S. Air Force
Charles Q. Brown Jr. (born 1962), U.S. Air Force four-star general
Earl Brown (general) (1927–2020), U.S. Air Force lieutenant general
George Scratchley Brown (1918–1978), U.S. Air Force general
I. G. Brown (1915–1978), U.S. Air Force major general
Norma Elaine Brown (1926–2003), U.S. Air Force major general

U.S. Marine Corps
Dudley S. Brown (1896–1971), U.S. Marine Corps major general
Leslie E. Brown (1920–1997), U.S. Marine Corps lieutenant general
Wilburt S. Brown (1900–1968), U.S. Marine Corps major general

Confederate States Army
John C. Brown (1827–1889), Confederate States Army major general

Others
Charles Henry Brown (1872–1917), New Zealand Military Forces brigadier general
James Sutherland Brown (1881–1951, Canadian Army brigadier general

See also
General Browne (disambiguation)
Attorney General Brown (disambiguation)